Rodolfo Rodríguez may refer to:

Rodolfo Rodríguez (Costa Rican footballer) (born 1980), Costa Rican midfielder
Rodolfo Rodríguez (Uruguayan footballer) (born 1956), Uruguayan goalkeeper